The Outaouais Jr. Académie are a Junior ice hockey team based in La Pêche, Quebec.  They play in the National Capital Junior Hockey League.

History
The 2006-07 and 2007–08, back-to-back seasons saw the Predators win the regular season and playoff season league championships.  The only two so far for the franchise.

Prior to the 2015-16 season the Predators re-branded themselves to the Outaouais Jr. Académie.

Season-by-season record
Note: GP = Games Played, W = Wins, L = Losses, T = Ties, OTL = Overtime Losses, GF = Goals for, GA = Goals against

Individual Player Awards

External links
Outaouais Jr. Académie Home Page

Eastern Ontario Junior C Hockey League teams
Ice hockey teams in Quebec
Ice hockey clubs established in 1996
1996 establishments in Quebec